Simkino (Simkä) is a rural locality (a selo) in Staropetrovsky Selsoviet, Birsky District, Bashkortostan, Russia. The population was 27 as of 2010. There are 3 streets.

Geography 
Simkino is located 27 km southeast of Birsk (the district's administrative centre) by road. Staropetrovo is the nearest rural locality.

References 

Rural localities in Birsky District